In the United States federal government, executive communication is a message sent to the Senate by the President or other executive branch official. An example of executive communication is a presidential veto message.

References
U.S. Senate: Reference Home > Glossary > Executive Communication

Legislative branch of the United States government
Legislatures
Political terminology